Badinga is a town in the Balavé Department of Banwa Province in western Burkina Faso. As of 2005 it had a population of 1948.

References

External links
Satellite map at Maplandia.com

Populated places in the Boucle du Mouhoun Region
Banwa Province